Ben Verbong (born 2 July 1949) is a Dutch film director and screenwriter. He has directed 18 films since 1981. His debut film The Girl with the Red Hair was entered into the 32nd Berlin International Film Festival.

Selected filmography
 The Girl with the Red Hair (1981)
 De Kassière (1989)
 The Indecent Woman (1991)
 De Flat (1994)
 Charlotte Sophie Bentinck (1996)
  (2005)
 The von Trapp Family: A Life of Music (2015)

References

External links

1949 births
Living people
Dutch film directors
Dutch male screenwriters
Dutch screenwriters
People from Tegelen